The Liberia worm snake (Letheobia leucosticta) is a species of snake in the Typhlopidae family.

References

Letheobia
Reptiles described in 1898